The vorticity equation of fluid dynamics describes the evolution of the vorticity  of a particle of a fluid as it moves with its flow; that is, the local rotation of the fluid (in terms of vector calculus this is the curl of the flow velocity). The governing equation is:where  is the material derivative operator,  is the flow velocity,  is the local fluid density,  is the local pressure,  is the viscous stress tensor and  represents the sum of the external body forces. The first source term on the right hand side represents vortex stretching.

The equation is valid in the absence of any concentrated torques and line forces for a compressible, Newtonian fluid. In the case of incompressible flow (i.e., low Mach number) and isotropic fluids, with conservative body forces, the equation simplifies to the vorticity transport equation:

Under the further assumption of two-dimensional flow, the equation simplifies to:

Physical interpretation

 The term  on the left-hand side is the material derivative of the vorticity vector . It describes the rate of change of vorticity of the moving fluid particle. This change can be attributed to unsteadiness in the flow (the unsteady term) or due to the motion of the fluid particle as it moves from one point to another (the convection term).
 The term  on the right-hand side describes the stretching or tilting of vorticity due to the flow velocity gradients.
 The term  describes stretching of vorticity due to flow compressibility. It follows from the Navier-Stokes equation for continuity, namely  where  is the specific volume of the fluid element. Sometimes the negative sign is included in the term.
 The term  is the baroclinic term. It accounts for the changes in the vorticity due to the intersection of density and pressure surfaces.
 The term , accounts for the diffusion of vorticity due to the viscous effects.
 The term  provides for changes due to external body forces. These are forces that are spread over a three-dimensional region of the fluid, such as gravity or electromagnetic forces. (As opposed to forces that act only over a surface (like drag on a wall) or a line (like surface tension around a meniscus).

Simplifications 
 In case of conservative body forces, .
 For a barotropic fluid, . This is also true for a constant density fluid (including incompressible fluid) where . Note that this is not the same as an incompressible flow, for which the barotropic term cannot be neglected.
 For inviscid fluids, the viscosity tensor  is zero.

Thus for an inviscid, barotropic fluid with conservative body forces, the vorticity equation simplifies to
 

Alternately, in case of incompressible, inviscid fluid with conservative body forces, 
 

For a brief review of additional cases and simplifications, see also. For the vorticity equation in turbulence theory, in context of the flows in oceans and atmosphere, refer to.

Derivation
The vorticity equation can be derived from the Navier–Stokes equation for the conservation of angular momentum. In the absence of any concentrated torques and line forces, one obtains:

Now, vorticity is defined as the curl of the flow velocity vector; taking the curl of momentum equation yields the desired equation. The following identities are useful in derivation of the equation:

where  is any scalar field.

Tensor notation
The vorticity equation can be expressed in tensor notation using Einstein's summation convention and the Levi-Civita symbol :

In specific sciences

Atmospheric sciences
In the atmospheric sciences, the vorticity equation can be stated in terms of the absolute vorticity of air with respect to an inertial frame, or of the vorticity with respect to the rotation of the Earth. The absolute version is

See also
 Vorticity
 Barotropic vorticity equation
 Vortex stretching
 Burgers vortex

References

Further reading 

 
 

Equations of fluid dynamics
Transport phenomena